All Shades of Iberibe is a collection of short stories by Nigerian author Kasimma. It was first published by Sandorf Passage 2021.

References 

Nigerian short story collections
2021 short story collections